Kristina Andreyevna Potupchik (born 19 January 1986) is a Russian blogger, a public figure, and the head of the Foundation for the Open New Democracy (FOND), engaged in the support of non-profit social projects on the Internet.

From May 31, 2004, she is a member Civic Chamber of the Russian Federation 5th composition.

See also
Happy Birthday, Mr. Putin!

References

External links
 Фонд открытой новой демократии
 

1986 births
Living people
People from Murom
Russian bloggers
Russian women bloggers
21st-century Russian politicians
Russian political activists
Russian women activists
Members of the Civic Chamber of the Russian Federation
Recipients of the Medal of the Order "For Merit to the Fatherland" I class
21st-century Russian women politicians